Otilia Pasarica  (born ) is a retired Romanian female volleyball player. She was part of the Romania women's national volleyball team.

She participated at the 1994 FIVB Volleyball Women's World Championship in Brazil. On club level she played for Dinamo Bucarest.

Clubs
 Dinamo Bucarest

References

1968 births
Living people
Romanian women's volleyball players
Place of birth missing (living people)